Stena, also known as the walrus of Hamina, was the nickname of a female walrus who, in July 2022, died while being transported in Finland. She was estimated to have been around 25 to 30 years old when she died.

Biography 
Stena was first spotted near Hamina, where she spent the night on a beach. Two days later, she got stuck in a fishing net near Kotka and capsized a fishing boat. Following this, Stena swam up a river and climbed over land to a domestic garden 150 meters inland. Stena was reportedly very weak, and it was decided to bring her to a veterinary hospital in a zoo.

Death 
Rescue teams hoped to transport Stena away from the garden in a box and over to Korkeasaari Zoo in Helsinki. However, she did not survive the journey. The zoo stated that she would likely not have survived in the wild. A pathologist was to determine her cause of death.

References 

Individual walruses
2022 animal deaths
2022 in Finland